This partial list of city nicknames in South Carolina compiles the aliases, sobriquets and slogans that cities in South Carolina are known by (or have been known by historically), officially and unofficially, to municipal governments, local people, outsiders or their tourism boards or chambers of commerce. City nicknames can help in establishing a civic identity, helping outsiders recognize a community or attracting people to a community because of its nickname; promote civic pride; and build community unity. Nicknames and slogans that successfully create a new community "ideology or myth" are also believed to have economic value. Their economic value is difficult to measure, but there are anecdotal reports of cities that have achieved substantial economic benefits by "branding" themselves by adopting new slogans.

Some unofficial nicknames are positive, while others are derisive. Many of the unofficial nicknames listed here have been in use for a long time or have gained wide currency.
Abbeville 
Pretty. Near. Perfect.
"The Birthplace and Deathbed of the Confederacy"
Aiken
"A Place Like No Other"
The Winter Colony
Aynor Little Golden Town
Anderson – The Electric City
Barnwell – Gateway to the Low Country
"Blacksburg Mayor David Hogue and councilmen Joe Ross and Mike Patterson will be sworn in Sunday to new four-year terms at 3 p.m. at Iron City Place, 101 S. John St., Blacksburg."
Bluffton – Heart of the Lowcountry
Charleston
Chucktown
The Chuck
The Big Sweet Grass Basket
The Holy City
Cheraw
 The Prettiest Town in Dixie
Chesterfield
 The Heart of the Carolinas
Clemson
Tiger Town
Title Town
Columbia
 The Capital of Southern Hospitality
 Cola City/Town
 River City
Soda City
Capital City
Elgin – Home of the Catfish Stomp
Paris of the Midlands
Greenville – Textile Capital of the WorldGreenville, South Carolina , RelocateAmerica website (accessed January 10, 2008)
Greenwood – The Emerald City
Lancaster – The Red Rose City
Myrtle Beach – Golf Capital of the World
North Augusta – South Carolina's Riverfront
Orangeburg – The Garden City
Pageland – The Watermelon Capital of the World
Rock Hill – The Gateway to South Carolina
Ruby
 Jewel City of the South
Spartanburg
The Hub CityFlynn, Sean P. "Classic cars to rumble through Spartanburg en route to West" , Spartanburg Herald Journal, April 6, 2007, accessed April 13, 2007. "The Great American Race is coming to the Hub City."
Sparkle City
Sumter – The Gamecock City
Walterboro - "The Front Porch of the Lowcountry"
Winnsboro – Rock City

See also
 List of city nicknames in the United States

References

South Carolina cities and towns
Populated places in South Carolina
City nicknames